From Russia with Love is an exclusive live album released by singer-songwriter Tori Amos in 2010. The concert was recorded in Moscow on September 3, 2010. The limited edition set included a signature edition Lomography Diana F+ camera, along with 2 lenses, a roll of film and 1 of 5 photographs taken of Tori during her time in Moscow. The set was released exclusively through toriamos.com and only 2000 were produced.

Track listing
All songs written and composed by Amos, except where noted.

Personnel
Tori Amos – vocals, piano, keyboard

References

Tori Amos albums